Poland Presbyterian Church and Cemetery, also known as Poland Historical Chapel and Poland Cemetery, is a historic Presbyterian church and cemetery on IN 42 near Co. Rd. 56S in Cass Township, Clay County, Indiana.  It was built in 1869, and is a gable-front, vernacular frame building with Gothic Revival style design elements.  It has a high pitched roof and triangular upper sashes. A vestibule and tower were added in 1893. The adjacent cemetery was founded in 1886, and includes nearly 400 headstones.

It was added to the National Register of Historic Places in 1990.

References

Presbyterian churches in Indiana
Churches on the National Register of Historic Places in Indiana
Gothic Revival church buildings in Indiana
Protestant Reformed cemeteries
Churches completed in 1869
Buildings and structures in Clay County, Indiana
National Register of Historic Places in Clay County, Indiana
1869 establishments in Indiana